Tradersville is an unincorporated community in Somerford Township, Madison County, Ohio, United States.

As of 1875, Tradersville contained one dry goods and grocery store, a post office, and a blacksmith shop.

The Tradersville Post office was established on March 2, 1848 and discontinued on January 19, 1883. It was then reestablished on January 24, 1900, and discontinued yet again on August 31, 1901.  The mail service is now sent through the London branch.

References 

Unincorporated communities in Madison County, Ohio
Unincorporated communities in Ohio